Samuel Crowther (1880–1947) was a prominent American journalist and writer who is best known for his collaborative writings with Henry Ford and other industrialists.

Life 
Crowther was born on June 14, 1880, in Philadelphia, Pennsylvania, his father also being Samuel Crowther. He was educated at the Friends Select School in Philadelphia and graduated B.S. (1901) and LL.B. (1904) at the University of Pennsylvania.

In college, he won his varsity letters in football and rowing and was a member of the university's crew that distinguished itself in the Henley Regatta. In 1905, his "American Rowing," the first history of the sport in the country, was published. He dedicated his writing career to publishing biographies of famous industrialists and collaborating with some of them to produce works that conveyed their ideas to the public. The most prominent and enduring collaboration was with Henry Ford, the car manufacturer.

He married Mary Jane Owens on November 21, 1914, and they had two sons and a daughter. He died in Boston, Massachusetts on October 27, 1947.

Career 
 1913 – Journalist with The Boston Post
 1918–1919 – Represented The New York Tribune and System Magazine in England and Germany.
 1932 – Associated with the United States Steel Corporation in an advisory capacity.
 During his journalistic career he interviewed many of America's industrial leaders.
 Contributions to Country Gentleman, World's Work, Saturday Evening Post, Ladies' Home Journal, etc.

Professional memberships 
 Fellow of the Royal Economic Society
 Member of American Economic Association
 Member of American Statistical Society

Publications 
  Rowing and Track Athletics (Rowing by S Crowther; Track Athletics by Arthur Ruhl) [With plates], New York: Macmillan Co., 1905.  A volume of the American Sportsman's Library.
 Common Sense and Labour. London & Garden City, N.Y.: Sir Isaac Pitman & Sons, 1920.
 Why Men strike.   London & Garden City, N.Y.: George G. Harrap and Co.,[1920.]
 The Book of Business. Edited by Samuel Crowther.  New York: P.F. Collier & son company, 1920.
 The First Million the Hardest.  An autobiography By Arthur B. Farquhar (1838–1925), in collaboration with Samuel Crowther.  Garden City, N.Y.: Doubleday, Page & Co.: 1922.
 John H Patterson: Pioneer in Industrial Welfare [With plates, including portraits]. Garden City, N.Y.: Doubleday, Page & Co., 1923.
 The Romance and Rise of the American Tropics. [Illustrated]. Garden City, NY: Doubleday, Doran & Co., 1929.
 $970,000,000 minus. A second primer. The results of a year of simple arithmetic, etc [On the foreign trade of the USA]. New York: Chemical Foundation, 1936.

Collaborative Publications 
 Tennis for Women. (Illustrated from photographs), Molla Bjurstedt and Samuel Crowther, London: Curtis Brown, 1916.
 My Life and Work. By Henry Ford, in collaboration with Samuel Crowther.  London: William Heinemann & Co., printed in U.S.A., 1922.
 Today and Tomorrow. By Henry Ford, in collaboration with Samuel Crowther. London: William Heinemann & Co., printed in U.S.A., 1926.
 Moving Forward. By Henry Ford in collaboration with Samuel Crowther, Garden City, N.Y.: Doubleday, Doran & Co.,1930.
 My Friend Mr Edison By Henry Ford, with Samuel Crowther [With plates]. London: Ernest Benn, 1930.
 Men and Rubber: The story of business. By Harvey Samuel Firestone, in collaboration with Samuel Crowther. London: William Heinemann & Co., printed in U.S.A., 1926.
 Why Quit Our Own. By George Nelson Peek with Samuel Crowther [On the desirability of a balanced domestic economy in the United States]. New York: D. Van Nostrand Co., 1936.

References

External links
 

1880 births
1947 deaths
American male journalists
Journalists from Pennsylvania
American male biographers
Writers from Philadelphia
20th-century American journalists
20th-century American male writers
20th-century American economists
Fellows of the Royal Economic Society
20th-century American biographers
Economists from Pennsylvania
University of Pennsylvania Law School alumni